Cl-4AS-1 is a dual anabolic–androgenic steroid (AAS) and 5α-reductase inhibitor. It is a potent and selective full agonist of the androgen receptor (IC50 = 12 nM) and inhibitor of 5α-reductase types I and II (IC50 = 6 and 10 nM, respectively). Structurally, Cl-4AS-1 is a 4-azasteroid.

See also
 TFM-4AS-1

References

External links
 Cl-4AS-1 - Santa Cruz Biotechnology

5α-Reductase inhibitors
Androgens and anabolic steroids
Androstanes
Carboxamides
Chloroarenes
Lactams